Lansing Campbell (1882–1937) was an American illustrator best known for his illustrations in the Uncle Wiggily series of books by Howard R. Garis. He also used the signature Lang Campbell. Lansing Campbell was an American illustrator of popular children's books. Campbell was born on March 3, 1882, in Carbondale, Jackson County, Illinois to John Gaines Campbell (1839 – 1913) and Alice Beman (1847 – 1920). 

In 1917, Campbell wrote and illustrated his own book, The Funnyfeathers (E. P. Dutton), featuring the adventures of the Dinky Duckings, Panty Banty, Pidgy the Poet, Daffy Duck and Old Crooky Crow. Other books by Campbell included Dippy Doodlebug, Bizzy Izzy Humbug, Duck and Applesauce, Dicky Bird's Diary and Merry Murphy. He also did Br'er Rabbit illustrations. His cartoons appeared in Life and Judge. He illustrated the cartoon strip, "Uncle Wiggily's Adventures" with Howard R. Garis  and created "Piggy Pigtail", "Paddy the Pup", "Dippy Doodlebug", "Bizzy Izzy Humbug", "The Dinky Ducklings", "Duck and Applesauce", "Dicky Bird's Diary," "Merry Murphy" and more on his own.

He died on May 26, 1937, in Raleigh, Wake County, North Carolina. He is buried in Oak Woods Cemetery, Chicago, Cook County, Illinois.

Career
From 1919 to 1929, he drew Uncle Wiggily's Adventures as a comic strip. During the decade, the comic strip's text evolved from captions to dialogue minus balloons to dialogue inside balloons.

During the 1930s, he drew the Sunday strip, Paddy Pigtail.

Campbell lived and worked in New York City.

Cultural legacy
Campbell's Uncle Wiggily illustrations were the main influence on Chris Wedge's short film Bunny which won the Academy Award for Animated Short Film for 1998 as well as a Golden Nica at the Prix Ars Electronica.

Howard Garis' grandson, Brooks Garis, has produced a video, Uncle Wiggily and the Pumpkin, with Lansing Campbell illustrations and music by Chris Brubeck.

References

External links
Uncle Wiggily's Apple Roast, illustrated by Lang Campbell (1919)
Famous Critters
Flickr: Lansing Campbell
The Perilous World of Lansing Campbell
 Lambiek Comiclopedia biography.

American children's writers
American illustrators
American comics artists
People from Carbondale, Illinois
1882 births
People from Boothbay Harbor, Maine
1937 deaths